The Nipissing Lakers women's ice hockey program represents Nipissing University in the Ontario University Athletics (OUA) conference of U Sports. The Lakers first competed in OUA women's ice hockey in the 2013-14 season and qualified for the OUA playoffs in their second season. The team has played in two McCaw Cup finals and in one U Sports national tournament, in 2022. The team is led by head coach Darren Turcotte, a former NHL forward and North Bay Sports Hall of Fame member.

History
Prior to their entry to U Sports (formerly Canadian Interuniversity Sport), the Lakers had fielded a women's ice hockey team that played in the Ontario Colleges Athletic Association. On June 26, 2012, it was announced that the women's ice hockey team would compete in Ontario University Athletics beginning with the 2013-14 season. After conducting a search for a head coach for the team's first foray into the OUA, it was announced on August 16, 2012, that Darren Turcotte had been hired for the position for the 2013-14 season. The Nipissing Lakers advanced to the USport National Championship for the first time in 2022, where they returned to North Bay as National Silver Medalists.

OUA results

USports results
2021-22 
Finished Second in Canada. 
Won Quart-Final (1-0) vs. UBC 
Won Semi-Final (4-0) vs. UNB 
Lost Championship (4-0) vs. Concordia

705 Challenge Cup
First established as a challenge between the varsity soccer teams of two Northern Ontario universities (Laurentian vs. Nipissing), in which the winning team was awarded the Riley Gallo Cup, the rivalry expanded. Introducing the 705 Challenge Cup in 2016, the results of all regular season games between the Lakers and the Voyageurs varsity teams for men’s and women’s basketball, ice hockey and soccer, comprised the overall won-loss record in determining the annual Cup winner. The Lakers would win their first 705 Challenge Cup during the 2019-20 athletics season. Of note, the scores below reflect the women's ice hockey matchups since the 705 Challenge Cup was introduced. The series ended following the discontinuation of the Laurentian Voyageurs women's ice hockey team in 2021.

Team captains
2015-16: Carly Marchment
2016-17: Kaley Tienhaara
2017-18: Kaley Tienhaara and Jackie Rochefort (Co-captains), Zosia Davis and Brooklyn Irwin, (assistant captains) 
2018-19: Kaley Tienhaara
2019-20: Jetta Derenoski (captain), Ava Keis, Katelyn Heppner, Madison Solie and Danika Ranger (assistant captains) 
2021-22: Katelyn Heppner (captain), Madison Solie, Madison Laberge, Maggie McKee and Brianna Gaffney (assistant captains).
2022-23: Ally Hayhurst (captain), Madison Laberge, Maggie McKee, Maria Dominico and Katie Chomiak (assistant captains).

International
Danika Ranger, Goaltender : 2017 IIHF World Women's U18 Championship 
Katelyn Heppner, Defence 2021-22 FISU Games Team Canada (event cancelled due to COVID-19)
Maria Dominico, Forward 2021-22 FISU Games Team Canada (event cancelled due to COVID-19)
Marilyn Fortin, Forward 2021-22 FISU Games Team Switzerland (event cancelled due to COVID-19)

Awards and honours
Jackie Rochefort, 2016 Nipissing Lakers Athletics Female Athlete of the Year 
Maria Dominico, 2022 Nipissing Lakers Athletics Female Athlete of the Year

OUA honours
Maria Dominico, 2017-18 OUA Rookie of the Year
Zosia Davis, 2017-18 OUA Defensive Player of the Year
Malory Dominico, 2019-20 OUA Rookie of the Year
Maria Dominico, 2021-22 OUA East Player of the Year

OUA All-Stars
Jacquline Rochefort, 2016-17 OUA Second Team All-Star 
Maria Dominico, 2019-20 OUA Second Team All-Star 
Katelyn Heppner, 2019-20 OUA Second Team All-Star
Maria Dominico, 2021-22 OUA First Team All-Star
Madison Laberge, 2021-22 OUA First Team All-Star
Brianna Gaffney, 2021-22 OUA Second Team All-Star

OUA All-Rookie
 Malory Dominico, 2019-20 OUA All-Rookie
 Allison Hayhurst, 2019-20 OUA All-Rookie
 Maggie McKee, 2019-20 OUA All-Rookie
 Katie Chomiak, 2021-22 OUA All-Rookie Team

USports All Canadians
Maria Dominico, 2021-22 USports First Team All Canadian

USports Performers of the Game
Chloe Marshall, 2021-22 Quarter-Finals vs UBC (1-0 win)
Ashlyn Zaharia, 2021-22 Semi-Finals vs UNB (4-0 win)
Maria Dominico, 2021-22 Finals vs Concordia (4-0 loss)

USports Championship All-Star Team
Madison Solie, 2021-22 USports All-Star Team (defence)
Maria Dominico, 2021-22 USports All-Star Team (forward)

References

External links 

Lakers
 U Sports women's ice hockey teams
Women's ice hockey teams in Canada
Ice hockey teams in Ontario

Sport in North Bay, Ontario
Women in Ontario